Araecerus fasciculatus, the coffee bean weevil, is a species of beetle belonging to the family Anthribidae. Despite its name, it affects a wide range of stored products and some field crops. Through trade it has become cosmopolitan in its distribution.

Description
These small weevils are dome shaped, with dark brown mottled elytra and hairy body. Antennae in males are longer than the body, with the three last segments forming a club. The last segment of the abdomen is not covered by the elytra.

They are a worldwide pest of cocoa, coffee and many of other plants. They commonly attack stored commodities. The larvae dig tunnels into the seeds, pupate inside them, and adults emerge, boring a hole. They are problematical only under high humidity storage conditions, and control is usually managed by fumigation in chambers with aluminium phosphide or carbon dioxide over a period of a week.

Distribution
Likely originating from the Indo-Australian region, these beetles have been distributed by commerce throughout tropical regions of the world.

They have been known to lay their eggs and complete their life cycle in citrus fruits in the field.

References

Beetles described in 1775
Taxa named by Charles De Geer
Anthribidae